The United National Empowerment Party was a Saint Kitts-based political party in Saint Kitts and Nevis. Led by Henry Browne, the party contested the 2004 general elections, but received just 263 votes and failed to win a seat. They did not contest the 2010 elections.

References

Political parties in Saint Kitts and Nevis
2000s in Saint Kitts and Nevis